Michael Winters may refer to:
Michael Sean Winters, American journalist and writer
Michael Winters (actor), American actor
Mike Winters (born 1958), American Major League Baseball umpire
Mike Winters (comedian) (1926–2013), English comedian known for the double act Mike and Bernie Winters

See also
Michael Winter (disambiguation)